Neoscytalidium is a genus of fungi in the Botryosphaeriaceae family.

References

Botryosphaeriales